Carlos V is a brand of Mexican chocolate bar, produced since the 1970s in Mexico and launched in 2005 in the United States by Nestlé.

About
The bar is named in honor of Carlos V, Holy Roman Emperor (known in English as Charles V and sometimes called Carlos I in Spanish because that was his title as ruler of Spain.) He introduced chocolate to the courts of Europe.

The candy is known for its marketing slogan "El Rey de los Chocolates", Spanish for "The King of Chocolates". Nestlé refers to the candy in English as "The 'king' of bars in Mexico".

The brand is popular in Mexico. It was owned by the Mexican chocolate company La Azteca (The Aztec) from the 1970s until the '90s, when the company was bought by Nestlé. La Azteca was formerly a subsidiary of Quaker Oats Company.

The confectionery bar is mainly milk chocolate and contains powdered milk.

Availability
The product is available in a 6-pack, a 32-count convenience pack and a 96-count box.
Candy Blog reviewed the release of this product in 2005, two years before it was officially released to the public. It is available mainly in Mexico, but also worldwide in certain stores.

See also
Nestlé Milk Chocolate
Yorkie (chocolate bar)
List of chocolate bar brands

References

External links
 

1970s establishments in Mexico
Chocolate bars
Nestlé brands
Cultural depictions of Charles V, Holy Roman Emperor